Pterolophia nigrolineaticollis is a species of beetle in the family Cerambycidae. It was described by Stephan von Breuning in 1961.

References

nigrolineaticollis
Beetles described in 1961